O 15 was a  of the Royal Netherlands Navy that saw service during World War II. It was the only submarine of the O 12 class built by Wilton-Fijenoord of Rotterdam. It was one of many Dutch ships doing convoy duty during the Spanish Civil War. When World War II broke out O 15 was stationed in Curaçao. It returned to Europe and was based in Dundee, whence it patrolled the coast of Norway and accompanied convoys to Archangelsk. The sub survived World War II and was taken out of active duty just after the Japanese surrender. It was demolished in 1946 in Hendrik-Ido-Ambacht.

Service history

Pre-war
With sister ship  , O 15 attended the Brussels International Exposition in 1935. During the Spanish Civil War O 15 was on convoy duty, from 23 March to 24 June 1937, protecting Dutch merchant ships. After 27 days the ship arrived in Curaçao on 29 October.

Second World War
During the Battle of the Netherlands in 1940 O 15 was in the Curaçao harbor for maintenance. In early July, after consultations between the Royal Netherlands Navy and the Royal Navy led to the conclusion that there was no need for Dutch submarines in the Caribbean, O 15 was ordered to go to England via Kingston, Bermuda and Halifax. In Hamilton, Bermuda, repairs were made to the diesel engines which were due for an overhaul at Halifax. Since parts and workers were not available at Halifax, O 15 sailed to Philadelphia. It helped in testing the CSC (Canadian Sea Control) type radar and only crossed the Atlantic for Dundee, Scotland on 15 September 1942. It patrolled the Norwegian coast and accompanied convoys to Archangelsk and was used on occasion for anti-submarine warfare and ASDIC testing.

Post war
O 15 returned to the Netherlands on 30 June 1945 and was docked in Rotterdam until 23 July. It returned to Dundee for training but was taken out of active duty shortly after the Japanese surrender and decommissioned in September. For a while O 15 transported personnel from Dundee to Rotterdam, and was sold on 2 October 1946, then demolished in Hendrik-Ido-Ambacht.

References

1931 ships
World War II submarines of the Netherlands
O 12-class submarines
Submarines built by Wilton-Fijenoord